A Pig's Tail is a 2012 British-American 5-minute stop motion animated short film directed by Sarah Cox, written by Matthew Walker, produced by Jason Bartholemew, Gutleben Christine and Heather Wright and created by Aardman Animations for The Humane Society of the United States.

Plot
Ginger imagines a future for her family that is much nicer than the dark and smelly intensive Pig Farm where they all live.

Cast
 Catherine Taber as Ginger
 Sophie Angelson as Mama Pig
 Heidi Lynch  as Mean Piglet
 James Arnold Taylor as The Farmer
 Kaia Rose as Nice Piglet

External links
 
 
 
 
 

2012 films
British animated short films
2010s English-language films
2010s British films